The Araucanía,  La Araucanía Region is one of Chile's 16 first-order administrative divisions, and comprises two provinces: Malleco in the north and Cautín in the south. Its capital and largest city is Temuco; other important cities include Angol and Villarrica.

Chile did not incorporate the lands of the Araucanía Region until the 1880s, when it occupied the area to end resistance by the indigenous Mapuche by both military and political means. This opened up the area for Chilean and European immigration and settlement.

In the 1900–1930 period, the population of Araucanía grew considerably, as did the economy despite recessions striking the rest of Chile. Araucanía became one of the principal agricultural districts of Chile, gaining the nickname of "granary of Chile". The administrative Araucanía Region was established in 1974, in what was the core of the larger historic region of Araucanía.

In the 21st century, Araucanía is Chile's poorest region in terms of GDP per capita. About a third of the region's population is ethnic Mapuche, the highest proportion of any Chilean region. The Araucanía Region has been the main location of the confrontations of the ongoing Mapuche conflict, as the Mapuche have pressed their land claims against the central government.

Geography
Virgin forests, featuring coigüe, raulí, and tepa, as well as bay and cypress trees, criss-cross the region in all directions. The majestic araucaria, or monkey puzzle tree, also known locally as pehuén, towers above the other trees. Its fruit—the piñón, a type of pine nut—is still a staple food for the indigenous Pehuenches.

A large part of this natural wealth is protected in various national parks (Nahuelbuta, Tolhuaca. Conguillío, Villarrica, and Huerquehue National Parks), or national reserves (Malalcahuello, Las Nalcas, and Alto Biobío).

History

Early Mapuche resistance
The Araucanía is the heartland of the indigenous Mapuche people, who resisted both Inca and Spanish attempts at conquest. After the government accomplished the occupation of Araucanía, it subdued the people, and since 1885, the territory has been part of Chile. After sending many forces against the Mapuche, the Spanish had earlier ended their losses by establishing the southern border of their colony in this area at the northern banks of the Biobío River.

Chilean conquest

Following independence, the Chilean government opted for peaceful relations with the Mapuche. Effective territorial occupation did not begin until 1862. During this time, the government allowed settlers to found new towns and constructed the railroad, telegraph, and roads into the area. After an occupation and sustained military action, Araucanía was fully incorporated into Chile in 1882. Many cities and towns in Araucanía were first developed as army outposts during and after the occupation of Araucanía. The last portions of the region to be reached by the army were Alto Biobío and Toltén River's lowlands.

These are the regions where Mapuche communities have thrived the best since the Chilean conquest. With the construction of the Malleco Viaduct in the 1890s, the region became more accessible. Settlements in southern Chile became more consolidated.

Granary of Chile

Until the mid-20th century, the large agricultural estates (estancias) that were established in Araucanía were cultivated in wheat, led to its being called the "Granary of Chile". With naturally fertile soil and the implementation of modern technology such as tractors, wheat harvests were extraordinarily high, but because the farmers did not perform  crop rotation, and indiscriminate logging and burning of woodlands was permitted, soils were prone to extensive erosion. They lost their fertility and much topsoil was lost to erosion.

Beginning in the 1930s, Villarrica Lake was developed as a tourism area.

Economic expansion and renewed Mapuche conflict

With the return of democracy in Chile in 1990, Mapuche organizations renewed their land claims on certain territories. Rising violence has accompanied what is now called the Mapuche conflict. Coordinadora Arauco-Malleco and similar activist groups have sometimes used arson attacks and death threats to back up their claims; other organizations, such as the Consejo de Todas Las Tierras, have sought and enjoyed international support from nongovernmental and their indigenous organizations.

Demography

Spanish settlers first arrived in Aracunia (one of two regional names) in the 1550s, but were unable to subdue the indigenous Mapuche.

In the late 19th century, the Chilean government endorsed a large-scale immigration and settlement program for the area. At the time, Chile often endorsed land allotment advertisement to Europeans, notably in Germany, Austria, and Switzerland, from where most of the new arrivals came. Beginning in the mid-19th century with the German Revolutions, immigrants were often fleeing political upheaval and poor economies, and seeking a new place to live. Other immigrants were Basques from northern Spain or southwest France, and some Argentines from across the Andes.

The current population is descended mostly from internal migration from the Central Zone of Chile; to a lesser extent, it consists of descendants of European settlers who arrived during and after the "pacification of Araucanía". The region has the highest proportion of indigenous residents of any in Chile, around 25%, of which the majority is Mapuche people. About 25% of the population is white or castizo (another form of mestizo (50%) of partial  European-Amerindian descent), and a large proportion of them is at least partially descended from Spanish colonists.

In 1903, a fleet of 88 Canarian families—400 persons—arrived in Budi Lake, that currently have more than 1,000 descendants, as a response to the government's call to populate this region and signed contracts for the benefit of a private company. While many Canarians obeyed their servitude, some of those who disobeyed the provisions of repopulation tried to escape their servitude and were arrested, and the indigenous Mapuche people took pity on the plight of these Canarians who were established on their former lands. The Mapuches welcomed them and joined their demonstrations in the so-called "revolt of the Canarians", and many Canarians integrated into Mapuche population to add the large mestizo population that exists in Chile.

Smaller numbers of Arab (largely Syrian, Lebanese and Palestinian), Chinese, Japanese, Korean and people of (North) American and Australian descent settled in La Araucania in the early 20th century. Temuco has a thriving Chinese, Taiwanese, and Syrian presence, and Capitán Pastene has a largely ethnic Italian community. Villarrica was where several thousand Afrikaners or Dutch South Africans settled after their expulsion from South Africa following the Boer War (1899–1903). These towns also were influenced by early Dutch colonists in the 16th century, when the region was nicknamed New Flanders. The Netherlands later ceded it to Spanish colonial rule.

During the past three decades, the city of Temuco has had the highest rate of growth in the nation. According to the census of 1970, about 88,000 inhabitants lived in Temuco. In the census of 2000, 30 years later, the population had tripled to 250,000. The resort town of Villarrica, on Lake Villarrica, has expanded rapidly. It is located next to the fast-growing resort of Pucón, now one of the four largest  tourist destinations of Chile. According to the 2002 census, the most populated cities are: Temuco (260,783, includes Padre Las Casas), Villarrica (45,531), Angol (43,801), Victoria (23,977), Lautaro (18,808), New Imperial (14,980), Collipulli (14,240), Loncoche (14,191), and Traiguén (14,140).

Economy
Until recently, Araucanía was dependent on cereal farming and was known as Chile’s granary. Agriculture has become highly diversified; wheat is still the main crop, but production of oats, grapes, and lupines has increased significantly, and fruit and flower growing are also emerging.

The main tourism centre in the region is the Villarrica Lake and Pucón.

Municipalities
The region consists of 38 municipalities: 

Angol
Carahue
Cholchol
Collipulli
Cunco
Curacautín
Curarrehue
Ercilla
Freire
Galvarino
Gorbea
Lautaro
Loncoche
Lonquimay
Los Sauces
Lumaco
Melipeuco
Nueva Imperial
Padre Las Casas
Perquenco
Pitrufquén
Pucón
Purén
Renaico
Saavedra
Temuco
Teodoro Schmidt
Toltén
Traiguén
Victoria
Vilcún
Villarrica

See also
Araucana breed from this area
Araucanization of Patagonia
Arauco War
Occupation of Araucanía
Kingdom of Araucanía and Patagonia

References

External links
Gobierno Regional de la La Araucanía, Official website 
 Kingdom of La Araucania and Patagonia, website

 
Regions of Chile